Achuvettante Veedu (Malayalam : അച്ചുവേട്ടന്റെ  വീട്) is a 1987 Indian Malayalam-language film directed by Balachandra Menon and starring Nedumudi Venu, Balachandra Menon and Rohini Hattangadi in the leading roles. The lyrics is by S. Ramesan Nair with music by Vidyadharan. The background score is done by Mohan Sithara.

Plot
The story is about Achuthankutty Nair (Nedumudi Venu), his wife Rugmini (Rohini Hattangadi) and his two daughters, Aswathy and Karthi. Achuthan relocates to a rented apartment in Trivandrum. His dream is to build his own house and struggles for it. In his new neighborhood there is a men's hostel which creates a nuisance to his life. Vipin (Balachandra Menon) stays in the men's hostel and creates trouble for Achuthankutty and his family. This made Achuthan tense day by day.

Achuthan dies unexpectedly due to a heart attack. Rugmini and her daughters are devastated due to his unexpected death. They are perplexed as to how the household will go on. They do not get any help from their family members since Achuthan had hatred to them while alive. Vipin, who sympathized with the family, help with every chance. He helps Aswathy (Rohini), the elder daughter, to get a job and also helps Rugmini. Aswathy looks after the family but gets adamant and bold. This makes Rugmini sad. Apparently, Aswathy falls in love with David, a man of different caste. Since both the families are orthodox, she seeks help of Vipin to arrange for the marriage. Vipin befriends David's father Jacob and cleverly agrees him for his son's marriage with Aswathy. During the wedding party, Vipin is insulted by Varma who was a friend of Achuthan. He talks bad about Vipin and Rugmini. Vipin reacts by slapping Varma. Aswathy gets furious and shouts which ends by insulting Vipin. He leaves, then Rugmini asks forgiveness for her daughter. Vipin is depressed and discusses the situation with his mother, who says there is nothing wrong with Aswathy because she has to protect the pride before her lover and his family. Then she asks Vipin to take over family business. Rugmini and daughter Karthi get sad after Aswathy's marriage as they have no one to depend now. Rugmani adds poison with supper and decides to commit suicide with her daughter. Karthi understands her mother's feelings and says that she will not become like her sister and will look after her mother. This gives Rugmini motive to live for Karthi. Later Vipin's mother offer Rugmini that she will help her find a job, so that she can fulfill Achuthan's dream of owing a house. In the end credits, it is shown that work has been started for Achuthan's dream house which signifies Rugmini's willpower.

Cast
Nedumudi Venu as Achuthankutty Nair
Rohini Hattangadi as Rugmini Kunjamma
Balachandra Menon as Vipin
Rohini as Aswathy Nair
Nangasseril Sasi as David 
Sukumaran as Prabhakaran
Jagannatha Varma as Varma
Meenakumari as Sarada
Thilakan as Damodaran Nair
Aranmula Ponnamma as Radhika, Achuthankutty's Mother
T. P. Madhavan as Santhosh, Rugmini's Brother
Sukumaran as Krishnankutty, Achuthankutty's Brother
Sankaradi as Jacob
Kaviyoor Ponnamma as Renuka, Vipin's Mother
Adoor Bhawani as Mary

Soundtrack

References

External links

1987 films
1980s Malayalam-language films
Films shot in Thiruvananthapuram
Films directed by Balachandra Menon